The Philippine Native Plants Conservation Society, Inc. (abbreviated PNPCSI), is a non-profit organization which is located in Quezon City, Philippines. The society was founded in 2007. The founding president of the society was Leonardo Legaspi Co.

Purpose of the society
The society is devoted to the conservation of indigenous Philippine plants and their natural habitats. The society is made up of people from many walks of life which include academics, government agencies, non-government agencies, plant enthusiasts, and garden clubs and horticulture groups.

References

External links
 Philippine Native Plants Conservation Society

Nature conservation in the Philippines
Non-profit organizations based in the Philippines